Ottumwa Community School District is a public school district serving the U.S. city of Ottumwa, Iowa, as well as the surrounding rural area in Wapello County.

History

In the 1950s, the smaller Dahlonega School District was absorbed into the Ottumwa School District. (Dahlonega School No. 1 was added to the National Register of Historic Places in 2000.)

On July 1, 1991, it absorbed a portion of the former Hedrick Community School District, which was involuntarily dissolved by the State of Iowa.

List of Schools 
Preschool: (Serves for Pre-K students)

 Pickwick Early Childhood Center

Elementary Schools: (Serves Grades K-5, unless otherwise noted)

 Douma Elementary (Grades Pre-K through 1st)
 Eisenhower Elementary
 Horace Mann Elementary
 James Elementary
 Liberty Elementary
 Wilson Elementary

Middle School: (Serves Grades 6-8)

 Evans Middle School

High School: (Serves Grades 9-12)

 Ottumwa High School

Other Schools:

 Wildwood Elementary (Closed to students in 2013) - Currently being leased to Ottumwa Christian School following an arson fire, which damaged their building beyond repair

See also
List of school districts in Iowa

References

External links
Ottumwa Community School District

Ottumwa, Iowa
School districts in Iowa
Education in Wapello County, Iowa